Ernest Coquet (6 January 1883 – 26 October 1946) was an English professional footballer who played as a full-back for Gateshead Town, Reading, Tottenham Hotspur, Port Vale, Fulham, and Leadgate Park. He helped "Spurs" to win promotion out of the Second Division in 1908–09.

Career
Coquet had spells with Seaham White Star and Gateshead Town, before joining Sunderland in 1905. He left the club to join Reading without making a first team appearance. In 1908 the full-back signed for Tottenham Hotspur, together with Billy Minter, in a combined £500 deal. He helped "Spurs" to win promotion out of the Second Division with a second-place finish in 1908–09, one point behind champions Bolton Wanderers. They went on to post 15th places finishes in the First Division in the 1909–10 and 1910–11 campaigns. In his three seasons at White Hart Lane he made 76 Football League, eight FA Cup and six Southern League appearances. Coquet then moved onto the Central League club Port Vale, scoring four goals in 51 games and helping the club lift the Staffordshire Senior Cup in the process. He was sold on to Fulham for a 'substantial' amount in January 1913. The "Lilywhites" finished eighth and ninth in the Second Division in 1911–12 and 1912–13, and Coquet featured in a further 49 matches at Craven Cottage, before ending his career at Northern League club Leadgate Park.

Personal life 
During the First World War, Coquet served in the Football Battalion, the Army Cyclist Corps and the Royal Engineers.

Career statistics

Honours
Tottenham Hotspur
Football League Second Division second-place promotion: 1908–09

Port Vale
Staffordshire Senior Cup: 1912

References

1883 births
1946 deaths
Footballers from Gateshead
English footballers
Association football fullbacks
Gateshead F.C. players
Sunderland A.F.C. players
Reading F.C. players
Tottenham Hotspur F.C. players
Port Vale F.C. players
Fulham F.C. players
Leadgate Park F.C. players
English Football League players
Southern Football League players
Northern Football League players
British Army personnel of World War I
Middlesex Regiment soldiers
Army Cyclist Corps soldiers
Royal Engineers soldiers
Military personnel from County Durham